Psalter 10th c. (National Archives of Georgia, fond #1446, manuscript #171) 2 pp. parchment; fragment; dimensions: 207x138; Asomtavruli; ink – brown; title and initials – with cinnabar; ruling lines are discernible.

The fragmentary preserved text is a pre-athonite translation of the Psalter. Another part of this manuscript, also fragmented, is kept at Korneli Kekelidze National Centre of Manuscripts (S-5222,
S-5223) and these fragments were inscribed in the  UNESCO Memory of the World Register in 2012.
The manuscript is dated from the 10th c.; in terms of the text version, it follows one of the earliest Georgian translations of the Psalter.

In 2015 Psalter 1446/171 was inscribed to UNESCO Memory of the World Register.

Literature 
The UNESCO Memory of the World Register. The Manuscripts Preserved in the National Archives of Georgia. Editor/compiler Ketevan Asatiani. Tbilisi. 2016

Internet resources 

http://www.unesco.org/new/en/communication-and-information/memory-of-the-world/register/full-list-of-registered-heritage/registered-heritage-page-8/the-oldest-manuscripts-preserved-at-the-national-archives-of-georgia/

Georgian manuscripts